VO5 is an American nu-disco and funk band from Madison, Wisconsin formed in 2005.

Career

In 2015 VO5 released the album Dance Originality. A music video for the single "Dance Originality" won the VOTD.TV award  and was on rotation on MTV.

VO5 performed at the 2012 Scott Walker recall election mass protests alongside Michelle Shocked. Their song "Cheddar Revolution" was included in the Cheddar Revolution: Songs of Uprising CD compilation.

During the 2010 US Senate election, a video of VO5 performing the song "Wonder Woman" along with candidate Tammy Baldwin gained national attention after Wisconsin governor Tommy Thompson campaign employee Brian Nemoir questioned Baldwin's "heartland values" for dancing at a gay rights parade.  Tommy Thompson was forced to apologize for his aides' "gay-baiting" in a TV ad and Baldwin went on to win the election.

Discography
 2006 "Wisconsin Rap" (single)
 2008 "Wonder Woman" (single)
 2010 Disco Your Ass Off EP
 2012 "Cheddar Revolution" (single)
 2015 Dance Originality LP
 2016 "If You Build a Wall (We'll Tear It Down)" (single)

References

External links
 VO5 Website
 VO5 facebook page
 YouTube

Reviews and profiles

 Wisconsin State Journal
 Isthmus
 PBS
 The State Times, NY
 Maximum Ink Magazine
 Rolling Disco Balls Magazine
 World Music Central

Culture of Madison, Wisconsin
Musical groups from Wisconsin